Pascal Arrighi (16 June 1921 – 18 August 2004) was a French politician.

Arrighi was born in Vico, Corse-du-Sud. He represented the French Radical Party (from 1956 to 1958), the Union for the New Republic (from 1958 to 1962), and the National Front (from 1986 to 1988) in the French National Assembly. He joined the National Centre of Independents and Peasants in 1989.

References

1921 births
2004 deaths
People from Corse-du-Sud
Corsican politicians
Radical Party (France) politicians
Union for the New Republic politicians
National Rally (France) politicians
National Centre of Independents and Peasants politicians
Deputies of the 3rd National Assembly of the French Fourth Republic
Deputies of the 1st National Assembly of the French Fifth Republic
Deputies of the 8th National Assembly of the French Fifth Republic
Corsican Resistance members